Lists of Marvel Comics publications cover publications by Marvel Comics, a publisher of American comic books and related media. The Walt Disney Company acquired the parent company, Marvel Entertainment, in 2009. The lists are organized alphabetically, by primary character and by imprint.

Alphabetic list 

List of Marvel Comics publications (A)
List of Marvel Comics publications (B–C)
List of Marvel Comics publications (D–E)
List of Marvel Comics publications (F–G)
List of Marvel Comics publications (H–L)
List of Marvel Comics publications (M)
List of Marvel Comics publications (N–R)
List of Marvel Comics publications (S)
List of Marvel Comics publications (T–V)
List of Marvel Comics publications (W–Z)

By primary character

List of Avengers titles
List of Captain America titles
List of Daredevil titles
List of Deadpool titles
List of Hulk titles
List of Iron Man titles
List of Nick Fury comics
List of What If issues
List of Punisher titles
List of Thor (Marvel Comics) titles

By imprint

List of Timely and Atlas Comics publications
List of current Marvel Comics publications
List of Marvel Digests
List of All-New, All-Different Marvel publications
List of Marvel UK publications

Publications